was a Japanese girl group formed by 81 Produce in 2010. The members consist of three voice actresses under the same company: Kana Asumi, Azusa Kataoka, and Sayuri Hara. They disbanded on July 31, 2011.

History

Lisp was formed as a girl group with the idea of having a "close connection to fans", and the name was selected to represent the members "growing together fans" even through the "clumsiness" of a lisp. The group is composed of Kana Asumi, Azusa Kataoka, and Sayuri Hara, voice actresses associated with 81 Produce.

In 2010, Lisp released their first and second digital singles, "Anata ni Vacuum! (Choi Yawarakame)" and "Anata ni Vacuum! (Choi Katame)", on the same day. On December 10, 2010, they released their third digital single, "Koisuru Otome no Catharsis." To promote the release, a short comic describing Asumi's journey to becoming a voice actress was published on December 25, 2010 in the magazine Cookie. The manga was written by Jun Kagurazaka and illustrated by Setsuko Yoneyama.

In February 2011, Lisp performed the song "Aru Imi! Kono Tabi?! Sensation" for the game Trickster. On April 13, 2011, Lisp released their first major single, "You May Dream", as the first opening theme song to Pretty Rhythm: Aurora Dream, which the members voiced the main characters. On June 11, 2011, they released their second single, "Love the Music", which was the first ending theme song to Bakugan Battle Brawlers under the name "Lisp feat. Dan", which also included a performance by Yū Kobayashi, the voice of Dan. In June 2011, Lisp announced that they were disbanding, with their last performance as a group during their first anniversary concert event on July 31, 2011.

Members
 Kana Asumi (2010-2011)
 Azusa Kataoka (2010-2011)
 Sayuri Hara (2010-2011)

Discography

Albums

Singles

Major

Promotional

Publications

Photo books

References 

Japanese girl groups
Japanese pop music groups
Japanese voice actresses
Musical groups established in 2010
2010 establishments in Japan
Musical groups from Tokyo
Pretty Rhythm